This is a list of listed buildings in East Renfrewshire. The list is split out by parish.

 List of listed buildings in Barrhead, East Renfrewshire
 List of listed buildings in Beith, East Renfrewshire
 List of listed buildings in Cathcart, East Renfrewshire
 List of listed buildings in Eaglesham, East Renfrewshire
 List of listed buildings in Eastwood, East Renfrewshire
 List of listed buildings in Mearns, East Renfrewshire
 List of listed buildings in Neilston, East Renfrewshire

See also
 List of Category A listed buildings in East Renfrewshire

External links

East Renfrewshire